Fuchuan Yao Autonomous County is an autonomous county of northeastern Guangxi, China. It is under the administration of Hezhou City.

Administrative divisions
As of January 2016, Fuchuan Yao Autonomous County has nine towns and three townships under its jurisdiction. The county seat is Fuyang Town.

Geography
Fuchuan Yao Autonomous County is located in the northeastern Guangxi, on the border with Hunan. It is surrounded by Jiangyong County on the north, Gongcheng Yao Autonomous County on the west, Jianghua Yao Autonomous County on the east, and Zhongshan County on the south.

Most of the county is in the upper basin of the Fuchuan River, a tributary of the He River (Guangxi) (Hejiang). The Fuchuan is dammed near the southern border of the county. The dam forms the Guishi Reservoir, which is used to irrigate agricultural land not only in Fuchuan County itself, but also in Zhongshan County and Babu District to the south.

Mountains
The main mountains in Fuchuan Yao Autonomous County are Mount Xiling, Mount Gupo, Mount Tiantang, and Huangsha Ridge.

Rivers and streams
There are over twenty rivers and streams in Fuchuan Yao Autonomous County. Among them, the main rivers are the Fuchuan River, Baisha River and Xiushui River (Guangxi).

Climate

Languages
Languages of Fuchuan County include the following.

Mien 勉话
Chinese
Fuyang 富阳话
Minjia 民家话
Qidu 七都话
Badu 八都话
Jiudu 九都话
Wuzhou 梧州话
Hakka 客家话
Baoqing 保庆话

Culture
The lusheng (mouth reed organ) is played by the Lowland Yao people (Pingdi Yao 平地瑶) of Dajing Village 大井村 and Humaling Village 虎马岭村 of Xinhua Township (新华乡), Fuchuan County.

Transport
Luoyang–Zhanjiang Railway

References

Bibliography

Fuchuan Yao Autonomous County
County-level divisions of Guangxi
Yao autonomous counties
Administrative divisions of Hezhou